Treasure County is a county in the U.S. state of Montana. As of the 2020 census, the population was 762, making it the second-least populous county in Montana. Its county seat is Hysham. The county was founded in 1919.

Geography
It is the fourth-smallest county in Montana by land area.

Major highways
 
  (Former)

Adjacent counties
 Rosebud County - northeast
 Big Horn County - south
 Yellowstone County - west

Demographics

2000 census
As of the 2000 census, there were 861 people, 357 households, and 242 families in the county. The population density was <1/km2 (1/sq mi). There were 422 housing units at an average density of 0.4/square mile (0.2/km2). The racial makeup of the county was 96.40% White, 0.12% Black or African American, 1.63% Native American, 0.35% Asian, 0.93% from other races, and 0.58% from two or more races. 1.51% of the population were Hispanic or Latino of any race. 29.2% were of German, 14.4% Norwegian, 11.2% Irish, 9.2% American and 5.5% English ancestry.

There were 357 households, out of which 30.80% had children under the age of 18 living with them, 59.10% were married couples living together, 4.20% had a female householder with no husband present, and 32.20% were non-families. 30.00% of all households were made up of individuals, and 15.10% had someone living alone who was 65 years of age or older. The average household size was 2.41 and the average family size was 2.98.

The county population contained 27.80% under the age of 18, 5.00% from 18 to 24, 23.20% from 25 to 44, 27.30% from 45 to 64, and 16.70% who were 65 years of age or older. The median age was 42 years. For every 100 females, there were 104.00 males. For every 100 females age 18 and over, there were 101.90 males.

The median income for a household in the county was $29,830, and the median income for a family was $34,219. Males had a median income of $22,750 versus $17,188 for females. The per capita income for the county was $14,392. About 8.50% of families and 14.70% of the population were below the poverty line, including 22.80% of those under age 18 and 11.10% of those age 65 or over.

2010 census
As of the 2010 census, there were 718 people, 335 households, and 219 families residing in the county. There were 422 housing units at an average density of 0.4/square mile (0.2/km2). The racial makeup of the county was 93.9% white, 0.8% American Indian, 0.4% Asian, 1.9% from other races, and 2.9% from two or more races. Those of Hispanic or Latino origin made up 3.5% of the population. In terms of ancestry, 40.2% were American, 22.4% were German, 9.9% were English, 9.9% were Irish, and 7.4% were Norwegian.

Of the 335 households, 22.4% had children under the age of 18 living with them, 58.5% were married couples living together, 2.1% had a female householder with no husband present, 34.6% were non-families, and 32.5% of all households were made up of individuals. The average household size was 2.14 and the average family size was 2.67. The median age was 51.5 years.

The median income for a household in the county was $37,969 and the median income for a family was $51,458. Males had a median income of $38,194 versus $26,563 for females. The per capita income for the county was $20,882. About 4.6% of families and 8.2% of the population were below the poverty line, including 15.2% of those under age 18 and 5.6% of those age 65 or over.

Politics
Treasure County voters are reliably Republican. They have only selected the Democratic Party candidate in five national elections (as of 2021) during the century of the county's existence as an independent unit.

Communities

Town
 Hysham (county seat)

Unincorporated communities
 Bighorn, Montana
 Myers
 Sanders

Ghost town
 Rancher

See also
 List of lakes in Treasure County, Montana
 List of mountains in Treasure County, Montana
 National Register of Historic Places listings in Treasure County, Montana

References

 
1919 establishments in Montana
Populated places established in 1919